Lauren Smith is the name of:
 Lauren Smith (badminton) (born 1991), British badminton player
 Lauren Smith (cricketer) (born 1996), Australian cricket player 
 Lauren Smith (swimmer), who competed for Great Britain at the 2011 World Aquatics Championships
Lauren Ashley Smith, American writer, producer, and comedian
 Lauren Lee Smith (born 1980), Canadian actress
 Lauren Spencer-Smith, Canadian singer-songwriter
 Lauren "Betty" Smith, the mother of Blythe Baxter in Littlest Pet Shop (2012 TV series)

See also
Lawrence Smith (disambiguation)
Larry Smith (disambiguation)
Laura Smith (disambiguation)
Loren A. Smith, American judge
Lorrain Smith (disambiguation)
Laurie Smith (born 1952), sheriff
Lorenzo Smith (born 1972), American singer-songwriter